Ould is an English surname and an Arabic name. In some Arabic dialects, particularly Hassaniya Arabic, ولد‎ (the patronymic, meaning "son of") is transliterated as Ould. Most Mauritanians have patronymic surnames.

Notable people with this surname include:

English surname
 Edward Ould (1852–1909), English architect
 Fielding Ould (1710–1789), Irish doctor 
 Johnny Ould (born 1940), British boxer
 Robert Ould (1820–1882), American lawyer

Arabic name
 Ahmed Ould Bouceif (1934–1979), Mauritanian military and political leader
 Ahmed Ould Daddah (born 1942), Mauritanian economist, politician and civil servant
 Ahmed Ould Sid'Ahmed (born 1949), Mauritanian diplomat and politician
 Ahmed Salim Ould Sidi Sidi (1939–1981), Mauritanian military and political leader
 Ahmedou Ould-Abdallah (born 1940), Mauritanian diplomat
 Bilal Ould-Chikh (born 1997), Dutch football player
 Cheikh El Avia Ould Mohamed Khouna (born 1956), Mauritanian political figure
 Ely Ould Mohamed Vall Mohamed Vall (1953–2017), Mauritanian political and military figure
 Ismail Ould Bedde Ould Cheikh Sidiya (born 1961), Mauritanian politician
 Ismail Ould Cheikh Ahmed (born 1960), Mauritanian diplomat and politician
 Mahfouz Ould al-Walid, Mauritanian Islamic scholar and poet previously associated with al-Qaeda
 Mohamed Cheikh Ould Mkhaitir, Mauritanian blogger and political prisoner
 Mohamed Khouna Ould Haidalla (born 1940), head of state of Mauritania
 Mohamed Lamine Ould Ahmed (born 1947), Sahrawi politician, writer and member of the Polisario Front
 Mohamed Lemine Ould Guig (born 1959), Mauritanian academic and political figure
 Mohamed Mahmoud Ould Louly (1943–2019), Mauritanian politician
 Mohamed Ould Abdel Aziz (born 1956), Mauritanian politician
 Mohamed Ould Ghazouani (born 1956)
 Mohamed Salem Ould Béchir, Mauritanian politician
 Moktar Ould Daddah (1924–2003), Mauritanian politician
 Moulaye Ould Mohamed Laghdaf (born 1957), Mauritanian politician
 Mustafa Ould Salek (1936–2012), Mauritanian politician
 Myriam Ould-Braham (born 1982), French ballet dancer
 Noureddine Ould Ali (born 1972), Algerian football coach
 Omar Ould Hamaha (1963–2014), Mali Islamist militia commander
 Saleh Ould Hanenna (1965–1966), Mauritanian soldier and political figure
 Sghair Ould M'Bareck (born 1954), Mauritanian politician
 Sid Ahmed Ould Bneijara (1947–2017), Mauritanian politician
 Sidi Mohamed Ould Boubacar  (born 1957), Mauritanian politician
 Sidi Ould Cheikh Abdallahi  (born 1938), Mauritanian politician
 Yahya Ould Ahmed El Waghef (born 1960), Mauritanian politician
 Yahya Ould Hademine (born 1953), Mauritanian engineer and politician
 Zeine Ould Zeidane (born 1966), Mauritanian economist and politician
 Zinédine Ould Khaled (born 2000), French football player

See also
 Auld (surname)
 Oxford University Liberal Democrats